Numbers of Sri Lankan internally displaced persons displaced from the Vanni region since October 2008 and detained by the Sri Lankan Military at various camps in northern and eastern Sri Lanka during February and March 2009:

References

Refugee camps in Sri Lanka
IDP 2009-02
IDP 2009-02